Richard Palmer Moe (born November 27, 1936) is an American attorney and historic preservation advocate who served as chief of staff to the vice president from 1977 to 1981.

Early life and education 
Moe was born in Duluth, Minnesota. He earned a Bachelor of Arts degree from Williams College in 1959 and a Juris Doctor from the University of Minnesota Law School in 1966.

Career 
Richard Moe served as an administrative assistant to Minneapolis Mayor Arthur Naftalin from 1961 to 1962 and the Minnesota Lieutenant Governor Sandy Keith from 1963 to 1967.

Moe then worked for the Minnesota Democratic–Farmer–Labor Party. He worked as the finance director (1967–1968) and the chairman of the party  (1969–1972). He was the second youngest chairman from the party.

He left the party in 1972 to work as an administrative assistant to Senator Walter Mondale. In 1977, Moe served as Chief of Staff to the Vice President of the United States during Walter Mondale's term. He later served on Mondale's presidential campaign team in 1984. Moe also worked on Dick Gephardt's presidential bid (1988) and the Michael Dukakis 1988 presidential campaign.

In 1981, Moe started work at the law firm Davis Polk & Wardwell, where he became a partner of the firm in 1986. Moe then worked as president of the National Trust for Historic Preservation.

National Trust for Historic Preservation
Moe led the National Trust for Historic Preservation from 1993 to 2009, and succeeded at expanding its budget despite funding reductions from Congress. During his tenure, Moe managed efforts to preserve historical sites, such as Manassas National Battlefield Park. Moe also guided the trust in its major effort to preserve historic structures and sites in New Orleans, Louisiana following Hurricane Katrina in 2005.

Awards
In 2007, Moe was awarded the Vincent Scully Prize by the National Building Museum in recognition of his contributions to the built environment. That same year, he received the Theodore Roosevelt-Woodrow Wilson Award from the American Historical Association.

Personal life
Moe married Julia Neimeyer on December 26, 1964. They have two children. He lives in Washington, D.C.

Works

Richard Moe, Carter Wilkie, Changing Places: Rebuilding Community in the Age of Sprawl, Henry Holt and Company, 1999,

References

External links

C-SPAN Q&A interview with Moe, February 19, 2006

1936 births
People from Duluth, Minnesota
Williams College alumni
University of Minnesota Law School alumni
Lawyers from Washington, D.C.
Living people
Chiefs of Staff to the Vice President of the United States
Davis Polk & Wardwell lawyers